The On Hing Building is an historic building in Victoria, British Columbia, Canada. It was built in 1891, but was only opened in 1901 according to BC Assessment e-value. It was always used for restaurants and commercial purposes.

See also
 List of historic places in Victoria, British Columbia

References

External links
 

1891 establishments in Canada
Buildings and structures completed in 1891
Buildings and structures in Victoria, British Columbia